Free spin may refer to:
 A dance move, see Glossary of dance moves § Free spin
 A type of 4D rollercoaster by S&S Worldwide, see 4th Dimension roller coaster § S&S Free Spin
 A type of bonus in slot machines